General Fraser may refer to:

Alexander Fraser (British Army officer, born 1824) (1824–1898), British Army general
Alexander Fraser, 17th Lord Saltoun (1785–1853), British Army general
Alexander Mackenzie Fraser (1758–1809), British Army lieutenant general
Charles Craufurd Fraser (1829–1895), British Army lieutenant general
Charles 'Pop' Fraser (1915–1994), South African Army lieutenant general
David Fraser (British Army officer) (1920–2012), British Army general
David Fraser (military officer) (fl. 1980s–2010s), Canadian Armed Forces major general
Douglas M. Fraser (born 1953), U.S. Air Force general
James Stuart Fraser (1783–1869), British Army general
John Fraser (British Army officer, born 1760) (1760–1843), British Army general
John Fraser (academic) (c. 1823–1878), Union Army post-service brevet brigadier general
Joseph Bacon Fraser (1895–1971), Georgia National Guard lieutenant general
Simon Fraser, 14th Lord Lovat (1871–1933), British Army major general
Thomas Fraser (British Army officer) (1840–1922), British Army major general
Tony Fraser (born 1958), Australian Army major general
William M. Fraser III (born 1952), U.S. Air Force general
William Archibald Kenneth Fraser (1886–1969), British Indian Army major general

See also
John W. Frazer (1827–1906), Confederate States Army brigadier general
Persifor Frazer (1736–1792), Pennsylvania militia brigadier general